Betel is a district of Paulínia, located 5 km to the East of Paulínia downtown, bordering the Campinas district of Barão Geraldo. Its area is about 49.5 km2 and it had a population of 6,242 at the time of the 2010 IBGE census. In 1993, the region was part of the district of Barão Geraldo in Campinas. That year, a referendum concerning its accession to Paulínia was held, as Betel was economically very attached to the city; the population voted to join the Paulínia municipality,  which subsequently expanded in area.

History 
The region of Betel began to be populated around the year 1889, when the Funilense Railroad was built. The railroad was a milestone for the settlement of Barão Geraldo and Betel. Betel was then a part of Barão Geraldo. In 1950 the Alvorada Parque neighborhood was founded, slowly expanding towards the region of the Constant Pavan Avenue. As Betel grew, it approached the city of Paulínia. In 1993, a plebiscite was held on the accession of Betel to Paulínia; 73.5% of 441 registered voters voted in favor of it, and Betel became a district of Paulínia.

Neighborhoods of Betel 
By 1993 Betel included two neighborhoods: Alvorada Parque and Okinawa. After that year, due to the intense urban growth, new neighborhoods appeared in the district. Currently there are 18 neighborhoods in Betel, condominiums and urban centers:

 Boa Esperança
 Business Center
 Centro Empresarial nossa Senhora de Fátima
 Condomínio Santa Izabel
 Fazenda do Deserto
 Greenville
 Jardim Ivone Alegre
 Morro Azul
 Moradas de Betel
 Okinawa
 Parque das Indústrias
 Polo de Ensino Profissional
 Porto do Sol
 Residencial das Paineiras
 Residencial Manacás
 Sítio Bonomi
 Unicamp (CPQBA)
 Vila Alvorada Parque

The population is concentrated in the Alvorada Parque and the Parque das Indústrias, which is located in the main shopping district.

Urban Organization 

In Betel there are three main avenues: 
 Alexandre Cazellatto Avenue, that connects the neighborhood Alvorada Parque to neighborhoods Parque das Indústrias and the Residencial Paineiras, near the Rodovia Doutor Roberto Moreira or PLN 010. 
 Constant Pavan Avenue, connecting the neighborhood Alvorada Parque to neighborhood Business Center and Nossa Senhora de Fátima, in PLN 010. 
 Professor Benedito Montenegro Avenue, connecting the avenues Alexandre Cazellatto and Constant Pavan and the region of Irene Karcher Avenue, the main core of industrialization of Betel.

Besides the above avenues, there are a number of secondary roads, which are:

 Avenida Armando Botasso Street
 Avenida Irene Karcher Avenue
 Avenida Maria Estéfano Maluf Avenue
 Avenida 1 – Business Center
 Avenida 2 – Parque das Indústrias
 Estrada do Morro Azul
 PLN 393
 PLN 464

Educational Center 
Betel is located in a center of vocational schools as composed of the ETEP, the SENAI, the CEFUP-Training Center of Public officials Paulínia as well as School Professor Domingos de Araújo, among others.

PLN 393 is located in the CPQBA (Center Multidisciplinary Research Chemical, Biological and Agricultural) of Unicamp, which conducts scientific and technological research.

Economy 
Betel is a major industrial center, being the second largest of Paulínia after the Replan region. Companies like Heringer, Galvani, Rhodia and Purina maintain industrial operations in Betel, which have seen increased pollution levels and subsequent environmental problems.

References 

Neighbourhoods in Paulínia